Codicia (English title: Greed) is a Mexican telenovela produced by Televisa and transmitted by Telesistema Mexicano.

Cast 
Lilia Prado
Héctor Gómez
Rafael Banquells
Bertha Moss
Ramón Bugarini
Xavier Loyá
Gloria Garcia
Guillermo Zetina
Luis Aragón
Julián García
Aurora Cortés
Lulú Parga
Patricia de Morelos
Alma Delia Fuentes

References

External links

Mexican telenovelas
1962 telenovelas
Televisa telenovelas
1962 Mexican television series debuts
1962 Mexican television series endings
Spanish-language telenovelas